Diane von Fürstenberg (born Diane Simone Michele Halfin, 31 December 1946) is a Belgian fashion designer best known for her wrap dress. She initially rose to prominence in 1969 when she married into the German princely House of Fürstenberg, as the wife of Prince Egon von Fürstenberg. Following their separation in 1972 and divorce in 1983, she has continued to use his family name.

Her fashion company, Diane von Furstenberg (DvF), is available in over 70 countries and 45 free-standing shops worldwide, with the company's headquarters and flagship boutique located in Manhattan's Meatpacking District.

She is the past chairwoman of the Council of Fashion Designers of America (CFDA), a position she held from 2006 to 2019; in 2014 was listed as the 68th most powerful woman in the world by Forbes; and in 2015 was included in the Time 100, as an icon, by Time magazine. In 2016, she was awarded an honorary doctorate from the New School. In 2019, she was inducted into the National Women's Hall of Fame.

Early years
Fürstenberg was born Diane Simone Michele Halfin in Brussels, Belgium, to Jewish parents. Her father, Bessarabian-born Leon (Lipa) Halfin, migrated to Belgium in 1929 from Chişinău, (at that time part of the Kingdom of Romania) and later sought refuge from the Nazis in Switzerland. Her mother was Greek-born Liliane Nahmias, from Thessaloniki, a Holocaust survivor, who was initially captured by the Nazis while she was a member of the Resistance during World War II. Eighteen months before Fürstenberg was born, her mother was a prisoner at Auschwitz concentration camp. Fürstenberg has spoken broadly about her mother's influence in her life, crediting her with teaching her that "fear is not an option."

Fürstenberg attended a boarding school in Oxfordshire. She studied at Madrid University before transferring to the University of Geneva to study economics. She then moved to Paris and worked as an assistant to fashion photographer's agent Albert Koski. She left Paris for Italy to apprentice to the textile manufacturer Angelo Ferretti in his factory, where she learned about cut, color and fabric. It was here that she designed and produced her first silk jersey dresses.

Career and brand

A year after marrying, Fürstenberg began designing women's clothes:  "The minute I knew I was about to be Egon's wife, I decided to have a career. I wanted to be someone of my own, and not just a plain little girl who got married beyond her deserts." After the Fürstenbergs separated in 1973, Egon also became a fashion designer. After moving to New York, she met high-profile Vogue editor Diana Vreeland, who declared her designs "absolutely smashing". She had her name listed on the Fashion Calendar for New York Fashion Week, and so her business was created. She moved into an estate in Connecticut she named  and has lived there ever since.

In 1974, she introduced the knitted jersey "wrap dress", which became an iconic piece in women's fashion; it is included in the collection of the Costume Institute of the Metropolitan Museum of Art. Soon after the launch, 25,000 dresses were selling each week; one million dresses had been sold by 1976, according to Forbes.. After the success of the wrap dress, von Fürstenberg was featured on the cover of Newsweek magazine in 1976. The accompanying article declared her "the most marketable woman since Coco Chanel." She launched a cosmetic line and her first fragrance, "Tatiana", named after her daughter. The New York Times reported that by 1979 the annual retail sales for the company were $150 million (equivalent to $ million in ).

In 1985, von Fürstenberg moved to Paris, where she founded Salvy, a French-language publishing house. She started a number of other businesses, including a line of cosmetics and a home-shopping business, which she launched in 1991. In 1992, von Fürstenberg sold $1.2 million (equivalent to $ million in ) of her Silk Assets collection in two hours on QVC. She credits the success with giving her the confidence to relaunch her company.

Fürstenberg relaunched her company in 1997, and reintroduced the wrap dress, which gained popularity with a new generation of women. Initially, the relaunch was a failure but, with the appointment of Paula Sutter as president of the brand, it was seemingly restored to its heyday of the mid-seventies. In 1998, she published her business memoir, Diane: A Signature Life. In 2004, she introduced the DVF by H. Stern fine jewelry collection, and launched scarves and beachwear. In 2006, she was elected president of the Council of Fashion Designers of America, a position she still holds. In 2008, she received a star on Seventh Avenue's Fashion Walk of Fame.

 In 2009, Michelle Obama wore the DVF signature "Chain Link" print wrap dress on the official White House Christmas card. That same year, a large-scale retrospective exhibition entitled "Diane von Furstenberg: Journey of a Dress" opened at the Manezh, one of Moscow's largest public exhibition spaces. Curated by Andre Leon Talley, it attracted  media attention. In 2010, the exhibition traveled to São Paulo; and in 2011, to the Pace Gallery in Beijing.

In 2010,the designer was awarded a gold medal at the annual Queen Sofía Spanish Institute Gold Medal Gala. In 2011, DVF introduced a home collection, and a signature fragrance, Diane.

In 2012, von Fürstenberg launched her first children's collection with GapKids and a denim collaboration with Current/Elliott.

Her clothes have been worn by celebrities including Catherine, Duchess of Cambridge, Gwyneth Paltrow, Kate Beckinsale, Madonna, Tina Brown, Jessica Alba, Susan Sarandon, Priyanka Chopra, Jennifer Lopez and Whitney Houston. Google Glass made its New York Fashion Week debut at the designer's Spring 2013 fashion show.

In 2014, the designer joined the Ban Bossy campaign as a spokesperson advocating leadership roles for girls. She also released her second memoir, The Women I Wanted to Be, an autobiography which delved into her personal life and upbringing.

Between 2017 and 2019, the DVF brand lost nearly $80 million, leading to an eventual 75% of the workforce made redundant in the U.S in May 2020. By 2018, sales, which had been $300 million before the 2008 recession, were down to $150 million.

In 2018, the brand banned mohair use after a PETA exposé showed workers mutilating and killing goats to obtain it. All fur, angora and exotic skins were also banned from future collections.

In 2020, DVF closed 18 of its 19 USA stores permanently.

Philanthropy
Fürstenberg is a director of the Diller – von Furstenberg Family Foundation, which provides support to nonprofit organizations in the area of community building, education, human rights, arts, health and the environment. In 2010, the foundation created The DVF Awards, presented annually to four women who display leadership, strength and courage in their commitment to women's causes. In 2011, the foundation made a $20 million commitment to the High Line.

In 2006, she was elected the President of The Council of Fashion Designers of America, (CFDA), after winning the Andre Leon Talley Lifetime Achievement Award in 2005.

Fürstenberg sits on the board of Vital Voices, a women's leadership organization, and served as one of the project chairs for New York City Mayor Michael Bloomberg's review of the future of NYC's Fashion industry, prepared by New York City Economic Development Corporation.

In 2016, Fürstenberg designed shirts for Hillary Clinton's presidential campaign.

In 2019, Fürstenberg launched #InCharge podcast, exclusively on Spotify, with a goal of empowerment for women. Podcast guests were Kris Jenner, Elaine Welteroth, Karlie Kloss, Priyanka Chopra and Martine Rothblatt, Teo Wan Lin, among others.

In popular culture
In 2014, Ovation TV featured The Fashion Fund, a documentary about the CFDA/Vogue Fashion Fund competition. Fürstenberg starred alongside Anna Wintour in the program.

In November 2014, the E! network started airing the first season of reality show House of DVF. Contestants on the show performed various tasks and challenges in the hopes of becoming a global brand ambassador for Fürstenberg. In September 2015, it returned for a second (final) season.

Personal life

At university, when she was 18, she met Prince Egon von Fürstenberg, the elder son of Prince Tassilo zu Fürstenberg (1903-1987), a German Roman Catholic prince, and his first wife, Clara Agnelli, an heiress to the Fiat automotive fortune and member of the Italian nobility. Married in 1969, the couple had two children, Alexander and Tatiana, who were born in New York City. She is now the grandmother of five, including Talita von Fürstenberg.

The von Fürstenbergs' marriage, although unpopular with the groom's family because of the bride's Jewish ethnicity, was considered dynastic, and on her marriage she became Her Serene Highness Princess Diane of Fürstenberg. However, she lost any claim to the title following their separation in 1972 and divorce in 1983.

In 2001, she married American media mogul Barry Diller.

In 2009, Fürstenberg signed a petition in support of film director Roman Polanski, calling for his release after Polanski was arrested in Switzerland in relation to his 1977 sexual abuse case.

On 28 February 2020, von Fürstenberg was made a Chevalier de la Légion d'honneur for her contributions to fashion, women's leadership, and philanthropy. She was presented the award by Christine Lagarde, president of the European Central Bank, in a ceremony at the Ministry of Europe and Foreign Affairs headquarters on the Quai d'Orsay.

Details of her ancestry were included in the episode "Fashion's Roots" (season 6, 13 October 2020), of the PBS series Finding Your Roots.

Published works

References

External links
 
 

20th-century American writers
21st-century American non-fiction writers
20th-century American women writers
21st-century American women writers
1946 births
American fashion businesspeople
American fashion designers
American women fashion designers
Clothing brands of the United States
American socialites
Belgian emigrants to the United States
Belgian Jews
American people of Belgian-Jewish descent
American people of Greek-Jewish descent
American people of Moldovan-Jewish descent
American people of Romanian-Jewish descent
American people of Russian-Jewish descent
Jewish fashion designers
Belgian people of Greek-Jewish descent
Belgian people of Moldovan descent
Belgian people of Romanian descent
Belgian people of Russian descent
Chevaliers of the Légion d'honneur
Diane
Dillers
Dillers
German princesses
High fashion brands
Living people
American memoirists
Jewish American philanthropists
American women memoirists
Jewish American writers
University of Geneva alumni
People with acquired American citizenship
Princesses by marriage
Eyewear brands of the United States
1970s fashion
1990s fashion
Vanity Fair (magazine) people